Bunso is a town in the East Akim Municipal District of the Eastern Region in Ghana. It is the site of the Bunso Arboretum and of Bunso Cocoa College.

References

Populated places in the Ashanti Region